William Joseph Corkindale (19 May 1901 – 1972) was an English footballer who played in the Football League for Clapton Orient, Luton Town, Millwall and Swansea Town.

References

1901 births
1972 deaths
English footballers
Association football forwards
English Football League players
Telford United F.C. players
Swansea City A.F.C. players
Leyton Orient F.C. players
Millwall F.C. players
Luton Town F.C. players
Shrewsbury Town F.C. players